Greatest Hits is a DVD by A.B. Quintanilla y Los Kumbia Kings. It was released on September 18, 2007.

Track listing
 "Na Na Na (Dulce Niña)"
 "Fuego"
 "Sabes a Chocolate"
 "Pachuco"
 "Mi Gente"
 "No Tengo Dinero"
 "Shhh!"
 "La Cucaracha"
 "Te Quiero a Ti"
 "Azúcar"
 "Boom Boom"
 "Baila Esta Kumbia"

References

2007 video albums
Kumbia Kings albums
A. B. Quintanilla albums
EMI Latin video albums
Music video compilation albums